Exophilia is "a fetishism whose object is the sexuality of extraterrestrials." In other words, it is a desire for extraterrestrial, alien, or other non-human life forms. The term was coined by the writer Supervert in the 2001 book Extraterrestrial Sex Fetish. Because exophilia originated in a literary work, it is not a paraphilia recognized by experts such as the American Psychiatric Association in its Diagnostic and Statistical Manual, Fifth Edition (DSM).

References 

Sexuality